Medicago arabica, the spotted medick, spotted burclover, heart clover, is a flowering plant in the pea and bean family Fabaceae. It is native to the Mediterranean basin but is found throughout the world, usually on clifftop grasslands and grassy places. It forms a symbiotic relationship with the bacterium Sinorhizobium medicae, which is capable of nitrogen fixation.

Description 
It is a sprawling plant with a height of 2–6 cm. It has spotted trifoliate leaves (sometimes, the number of leaflets per leaf can be different). The flowers are pale yellow and appear between April and August. The fruits are legumes, strangely coiled and are sharply spiny.

References

arabica
Flora of Lebanon and Syria
Flora of the Arabian Peninsula
Flora of Egypt
Flora of Malta